The President's Memorial Award or President's Award is presented by the Academy of Science Fiction, Fantasy and Horror Films, in conjunction with their annual Saturn Award ceremony.  The award is given for quality genre entertainment, and is named in honor of Academy founder, Dr. Donald A. Reed.

Recipients
Below is a list of recipients and the year the award was presented:

Time Bandits (1982)
Roger Corman (1984)
Jack Arnold (1985)
Woody Allen (1986)
The Purple Rose of Cairo (1986)
Joseph Stefano (1987)
Marshall Brickman (1987)
The Manhattan Project (1987)
Mike Jittlov (1988)
The Wizard of Speed and Time (1988)
Carrie Fisher (1990)
Batman (1991)
Robert Shaye (1992)
Gale Anne Hurd (1993)
Steven Spielberg (1994)
Bryan Singer (1996)
Robert Wise (1996)
Billy Bob Thornton (1997)
James Cameron (1998)
Gods and Monsters (1998)
William Friedkin (1999)
David Shepard (1999)
Richard Donner (2000)
Dustin Lance Black (2001)
Sherry Lansing (2002)
James Cameron (2003)
Gale Anne Hurd (2004)
Steven E. de Souza
Elsa Lanchester
Guillermo del Toro (2018)

External links
 Official Saturn Awards website

Saturn Awards
Mass media science fiction awards
Fantasy awards